William Andrew Veitch (25 May 1870 – 1 January 1961) was a New Zealand politician. He began his career in the labour movement, but became a strong opponent of more militant socialism, and rejected the radical views held by many of his colleagues.

Early life
Veitch was born in Port of Menteith, a small town in Perthshire, Scotland. After receiving a basic education, at the same school his father was a teacher, he worked for the post and telegraph service until 1887. He then moved to New Zealand, briefly taking up gum digging before returning to telegraphs. In 1889 he gained employment with the New Zealand Railways Department, starting as a cleaner he eventually became an engine driver by 1908.

Veitch was stationed in various North Island towns for the duration of his career except for two years in Canterbury. During his time on the railways, he became active in the Amalgamated Society of Railway Servants, a rail-workers union. He was the secretary of the Cross Creek branch from 1904 to 1906 and then proceeded to become chairman of the Wanganui branch in 1907. In 1908 he was elected national president and would remain so until 1912. During the period he was president Veitch oversaw a large restructure of the union and presented petitions seeking improved pay and working conditions to Parliament. Veitch was also involved in local affairs, serving as a member of the Wanganui Harbour Board and later he was on the Wanganui River Trust Domain Board.

In comparison to other unionists at the time, Veitch was relatively moderate in his views, but was still dissatisfied with the government's response to various grievances. Believing that workers' goals were better served by political action than strikes, Veitch contested the Wanganui seat in the 1911 election, and defeated the incumbent MP, James Thomas Hogan. Despite there being two labour-aligned parties contesting the election, Veitch chose to stand as an independent Labourite.

Parliamentary career

Early career
In Parliament, Veitch initially voted against the Liberal government of Joseph Ward. This was part agreement he had made with the opposition Reform Party, which had offered him support in the second ballot of his election bid. After discharging this obligation, however, he immediately became a Liberal Party supporter, voting in favour of Ward only two days later. He seriously considered joining the Liberal Party, but when the new United Labour Party (ULP) was founded in 1912, Veitch opted to join that instead.

The following year, when the ULP agreed to merge with the Socialist Party to form the Social Democratic Party, Veitch was among those who rejected the move, and continued to work under the ULP banner. His primary concern with the new Social Democrats were clauses which required the party to support strikes, which Veitch believed were ineffective and unnecessarily disruptive to society. Most of the ULP dissenters were eventually re-united with the Social Democrats when the modern Labour Party was formed, but Veitch remained in Parliament as an independent. In 1917, he unsuccessfully contested the Wanganui mayoralty. Despite predictions of a very close result, he was beaten comfortably by incumbent mayor Charles Mackay.

Liberal Party
In 1922, he finally joined what remained of the Liberal Party. The Liberals were disunited and disorganised, and Veitch was a significant figure in the party's rejuvenation. In 1928, Veitch joined his faction of the Liberals with others led by George Forbes and Albert Davy, creating the United Party. Veitch and Forbes contested the leadership of the new group, but in the end, the position was given to Joseph Ward, a former Liberal Prime Minister brought in by Davy as a compromise candidate.

United Government
When the United Party formed a government, Veitch one of the few members of the government with extensive parliamentary experience, became a member of Cabinet. New Prime Minister Sir Joseph Ward appointed him Minister of Transport, Minister of Labour and Minister of Mines. Later in 1931, when George Forbes succeeded Ward as Prime Minister, Veitch dropped the mining and labour portfolios and was instead made Minister of Railways while alsi retaining transport. When United formed a coalition with the Reform Party, Veitch lost his position to make room for ministers from Reform. Later, when the coalition government devalued the currency, Veitch began to reject his party's leadership, and tried to convince William Downie Stewart to form a new party.

End of Parliamentary career and later years
In 1935, Veitch joined the newly created "anti-socialist" Democrat Party launched by Albert Davy; but he was defeated in his re-election bid for Wanganui in the 1935 general election by the Labour candidate Joe Cotterill. His son Henry Charles Veitch stood at the next election in 1938 for the National Party (the successor to the United-Reform coalition) but also lost to Cotterill.

Considerably later, in 1943, Veitch stood for the National Party in the Wellington Suburbs electorate, but was unsuccessful, losing to Labour's Harry Combs.

Veitch died in Paraparaumu in 1961, survived by his six children.

Awards and honours
He was awarded the King George V Silver Jubilee Medal in 1935 and the 1937 Coronation Medal for services to New Zealand.

Personal life
He married Emma Elizabeth Gurr in Wanganui on 7 April 1896 with whom he had three sons and three daughters. Emma died in 1944 and he would remarry to Ann Sinclair Davidson on 19 May 1951 in Dunedin. Ann later died in 1959.

Notes

References

|-

|-

|-

|-

1870 births
1961 deaths
Scottish emigrants to New Zealand
People from Whanganui
New Zealand trade unionists
Local politicians in New Zealand
20th-century New Zealand politicians
Members of the New Zealand House of Representatives
New Zealand MPs for North Island electorates
Independent MPs of New Zealand
United Labour Party (New Zealand) MPs
New Zealand Liberal Party MPs
United Party (New Zealand) MPs
New Zealand Democrat Party (1934) politicians
New Zealand National Party politicians
Members of the Cabinet of New Zealand
Unsuccessful candidates in the 1935 New Zealand general election
Unsuccessful candidates in the 1943 New Zealand general election